Adelpha bredowii, the Bredow's sister, is a species of butterfly in the family Nymphalidae. It is endemic to western, central, and southern Mexico. Adelpha bredowii belongs to the serpa species group in the genus Adelpha (sisters). Adelpha bredowii previously included two subspecies, the California sister (Adelpha bredowii californica) and the Arizona sister (Adelpha bredowii eulalia). Recent phylogenetic studies, however, conclude that morphological, geographical, and genetic evidence make it clear that these are correctly separate species. They have been reclassified as the species Adelpha californica and Adelpha eulalia, respectively.

References

Adelpha
Nymphalidae of South America
Butterflies described in 1837
Taxa named by Carl Geyer